The human gene SPAST codes for the microtubule-severing protein of the same name, commonly known as spastin.

This gene encodes a member of the AAA (ATPases associated with a variety of cellular activities) protein family. Members of this protein family share an ATPase domain and have roles in diverse cellular processes including membrane trafficking, intracellular motility, organelle biogenesis, protein folding, and proteolysis. The encoded ATPase may be involved in the assembly or function of nuclear protein complexes. Two transcript variants encoding distinct isoforms have been identified for this gene. Other alternative splice variants have been described but their full length sequences have not been determined. Mutations associated with this gene cause the most frequent form of autosomal dominant spastic paraplegia 4.

See also
Spastic paraplegia

References

Further reading

External links
  GeneReviews/NCBI/NIH/UW entry on Spastic Paraplegia Type 4